Cytochrome P450 family 19 subfamily A member 1 is a protein that in humans is encoded by the CYP19A1 gene.

Function

This gene encodes a member of the cytochrome P450 superfamily of enzymes. The cytochrome P450 proteins are monooxygenases which catalyze many reactions involved in drug metabolism and synthesis of cholesterol, steroids and other lipids. This protein localizes to the endoplasmic reticulum and catalyzes the last steps of estrogen biosynthesis. Mutations in this gene can result in either increased or decreased aromatase activity; the associated phenotypes suggest that estrogen functions both as a sex steroid hormone and in growth or differentiation. Alternative promoter use and alternative splicing results in multiple transcript variants that have different tissue specificities. [provided by RefSeq, Dec 2016].

References

Further reading